The terminology quantum compass often relates to an instrument which measures relative position using the technique of atom interferometry. It includes an ensemble of accelerometers and gyroscope based on quantum technology to form an Inertial Navigation Unit.

Description 
The work about quantum technology based inertial measurement units (IMUs), the instruments containing the gyroscopes and accelerometers follows from the early demonstrations of matter-wave based accelerometers and gyrometers. The first demonstration of onboard acceleration measurement was made on an Airbus A300 in 2011.

A quantum compass contains clouds of atoms frozen using lasers. By measuring the movement of these frozen particles over precise periods of time the motion of the device can be calculated. The device would then provide a tamper proof accurate position in circumstances where satellites are not available for satellite navigation, e.g. a fully submerged submarine.

Various defence agencies worldwide, such as DARPA or the United Kingdom Ministry of Defence  have pushed the development of prototypes for future uses in submarines and aircraft.

References

Measuring instruments
Speed sensors
Vehicle parts
Vehicle technology